Eric Rosenthal is an American lawyer and activist. He is the founder and executive director of Disability Rights International (DRI). Since establishing DRI in 1993, Rosenthal has trained human rights and disability activists and provided assistance to governments and international development organizations worldwide.

Rosenthal's path-breaking efforts brought world attention to the rights of people with disabilities, exposing a vacuum in international human rights advocacy that has now been filled by the growth of a new international disability rights movement. His documentation of abuses inflicted upon millions of children and adults with disabilities in more than 25 countries has led nations to end human rights violations and has attracted unprecedented attention from international media and government agencies. He is an often-heard voice before American and international human rights agencies and is widely credited for bringing attention to the rights of people with disabilities as a fundamental human rights issue. The worldwide attention Rosenthal brought to human rights violations against people with disabilities was instrumental in gaining United Nations support for adoption of the Convention on the Rights of Persons with Disabilities, now ratified by 130 countries.

He is the main author of several major reports on international disability rights and has published numerous academic articles on the international human rights of people with disabilities. Rosenthal has also served as a consultant to the World Health Organization (WHO), UNICEF, the United Nations Special Rapporteur on Disability, and the US National Council on Disability.

Advocacy 
Rosenthal has conducted investigations and trained activists in more than 25 countries. His advocacy efforts before American and international human rights agencies is widely credited for framing the rights of people with disabilities as a fundamental human rights issue. He has co-authored over 20 reports and published countless articles on the abuses of persons with disabilities. Rosenthal and his work have been profiled by The New York Times Magazine, 20/20, Good Morning America, and Nightline, and have been the subject of main editorials in The New York Times, The International Herald Tribune, and The Washington Post.

US International Council on Disability 
Rosenthal is a board member and former Vice-President of the US International Council on Disability (USICD), and he chaired the USICD Committee working for US ratification of the UN Convention on the Rights of Persons with Disabilities (CRPD).

Background and education  
Rosenthal has a BA degree with honors from University of Chicago and a J.D. degree cum laude from the Georgetown University Law Center.

Rosenthal's dedication to addressing the rights of persons with disabilities occurred in 1992, when, just out of law school, he traveled to Mexico while working for Minnesota Advocates for Human Rights to document abuses against the indigenous population in Chiapas. While there, he visited the main psychiatric hospital in Mexico City and was so appalled by the physical and treatment conditions there that he committed himself to working for the human rights of people with disabilities around the world, to advocate for the issue before the global community, and to create change.

Awards received
 Charles Bronfman Prize
Echoing Green Public Service Fellowship
 Thomas J. Dodd Prize in International Justice and Human Rights (accepted on behalf of DRI)
 Ashoka Fellowship
 American Psychiatric Association's Human Rights Award
 University of Chicago Public Service Award
 Ford Foundation Fellowship in International Law
 Humanitarian Award from the Mental Health Association of New York
 Henry B. Betts Award (2008) from the American Association of People with Disabilities

References

  USICD biography

American lawyers
Living people
Georgetown University Law Center alumni
American disability rights activists
Year of birth missing (living people)
University of Chicago alumni